Sohee Park (born April 29, 1996) is a South Korean womenswear designer based in London, United Kingdom. She is known for the clothing label Miss Sohee, which has been worn by Miley Cyrus, Cardi B, Bella Hadid, Ariana Grande, Gemma Chan, Naomi Campbell, Gigi Hadid, Julia Fox, and Christina Aguilera.

Early life and education
Park was born in Seoul, South Korea, in 1996. She was raised in Seoul.

While studying fashion at the Central Saint Martins in London, Park interned under designers such as Marc Jacobs. She graduated from Central Saint Martins in 2020 and eventually launched her label, Miss Sohee.

Career
Park launched her debut collection, "The Girl in Full Bloom," under her label Miss Sohee in 2020. Due to the COVID-19 pandemic, there was no final year show to present the collection. Instead, Park released a series of photographs of her floral-style pieces online.

Looks from her graduate collection were featured on the cover of LOVE magazine, and Christian Cowan asked her to collaborate with him for his Spring 2021 collection.

Since her debut, her designs have appeared on the likes of several notable celebrities, including Miley Cyrus, Cardi B, Bella Hadid, Ariana Grande, Gemma Chan, Naomi Campbell, Gigi Hadid, Julia Fox, and Christina Aguilera.

Sohee Park then made her fashion week debut in February 2022 at the Milan Fashion Week with the support of Domenico Dolce and Stefano Gabbana of Dolce & Gabbana. Later in 2022, Park's Peony gown from the "Girl in Full Bloom" collection was exhibited for the Hallyu! The Korean Wave Exhibition at the Victoria and Albert Museum.

Park currently specializes in Couture

Appearances
Park's designs were seen on many notable red carpets, such as the Met Gala, The Amfar Gala, VMAs, AMAs, and the Vanity Fair Oscars Party.

Miley Cyrus wore a Miss Sohee peony gown to backdrop her performance at the Graham Norton Show.

The Eternals actress Gemma Chan wore black separates teamed with a matching headpiece by Sohee Park for her Red Carpet look at the Rome Film Festival in 2021.

Rita Ora wore an embellished gown from Miss Sohee's fall 2022 collection for the Oscars after-party in 2022.

American model and former Victoria's Secret angel Taylor Marie Hill attended the 2022 Met Gala wearing Miss Sohee's blue satin off-the-shoulder gown with long sleeves. American actress Chloe Fineman also wore Park's design for the event.

References

External links

Living people
1996 births
South Korean fashion designers
South Korean women fashion designers
People from Seoul
South Korean women in business
Clothing brands of the United Kingdom
South Korean expatriates in the United Kingdom
Alumni of the University of the Arts London